BCRU may refer to:
Bath Cancer Research Unit, a cancer research association in Bath, England
British Columbia Rugby Union, the provincial administrative body for rugby union in British Columbia